Shubha (शुभा) is  a female given-name among Hindus and means auspicious, or bringing good luck. The meaning comes from the root, Shubh (शुभ).
Notable people named Shubha include:
 Shubha Mudgal: a Hindustani classical music singer
 Shubha Raul: Mayor of the Indian metropolis of Mumbai since 10 March 2007

Given names